The Orscholz Switch, or Siegfried Switch, was a military defensive "switch" position and part of the Siegfried Line (Westwall) located in the triangle between the rivers Saar and Moselle.  It was built in 1939 and 1940 and incorporated 75 bunkers as well as 10.2 km of tank obstacles in the form of dragon's teeth. This defensive line ran from Trier to Nennig along the Moselle and from Nennig in an easterly direction to Orscholz on the loop in the Saar river at  Mettlach.

In 1945 - towards the end of the Second World War - the Orscholz Switch was the scene of hard fighting for months.

During Operation Undertone (15 - 24 March 1945) it lay on the left flank of advancing US Army units.

See also  
 Besseringen B-Werk

Sources

External links  
 US Army in World War II - The Last Offensive

Fortresses in Germany
Merzig-Wadern
Siegfried Line